Giridava (Giridaua, Geridava) was a Tracian town, situated in Moesia, modern northern Bulgaria.

See also 
 Dacian davae
 List of ancient cities in Thrace and Dacia
 Dacia
 Roman Dacia

Notes

References

Modern

Further reading 

 

Dacian towns
Archaeological sites in Bulgaria
Ruins in Bulgaria
Ancient Bulgaria